The 2017–18 Northwestern Wildcats men's basketball team represented Northwestern University in the 2017–18 NCAA Division I men's basketball season. They were led by fifth-year head coach Chris Collins as members of the Big Ten Conference. They played their home games at Allstate Arena in Rosemont, Illinois while the university's Welsh-Ryan Arena, underwent renovations. A winning record in the Big Ten as well, a Round-of-32 NCAA appearance in 2016–17, and the return of all key offensive contributors led to big expectations for the 2017–18 season. But the Wildcats stumbled to a poor start, finishing the season with a disappointing 15–17 record, 6–12 in Big Ten play to finish in 10th place. They lost in the second round of the Big Ten tournament to Penn State.

Previous season
The Wildcats finished the 2016–17 season 24–12, 10–8 in Big Ten play to finish in a tie for fifth place. In the Big Ten tournament, they defeated Rutgers and Maryland before losing to Wisconsin in the semifinals. They received the school's first ever bid to the NCAA tournament as a No. 8 seed in the West region. In the First Round, they defeated No. 9-seeded Vanderbilt before losing to No. 1-seeded Gonzaga in the second round.

Offseason

Coaching changes 
On June 20, 2017, assistant coach Patrick Baldwin left the school to become the head coach at Milwaukee. On June 26, the school hired Michigan assistant coach Billy Donlon to replace Baldwin.

Departures

Incoming transfers

Recruiting classes

2017 recruiting class

2018 recruiting class

Preseason 
In its annual preseason preview, the Blue Ribbon Yearbook ranked Northwestern as No. 23 in the country.

Roster

Schedule and results

|-
!colspan=9 style=| Regular season

|-
!colspan=9 style=|Big Ten tournament

Rankings

*AP does not release post-NCAA tournament rankings

See also
2017–18 Northwestern Wildcats women's basketball team

References

Northwestern Wildcats
Northwestern Wildcats men's basketball seasons
Northwestern Wild
Northwestern Wild